Proctocera senegalensis is a species of beetle in the family Cerambycidae. It was described by James Thomson in 1857, originally under the genus Clinia. It is known from the Democratic Republic of the Congo, Liberia, the Ivory Coast, Cameroon, Togo, and Senegal.

References

Lamiinae
Beetles described in 1857
Taxa named by James Thomson